Jade Scott Yorker (born June 16, 1985) is an American actor of film and television. Among his TV credits are Cosby, Third Watch and Law & Order. His most famous role is the role of William "Willie" Weathers in Gridiron Gang.

He grew up in Manalapan Township, New Jersey and Manalapan High School. He later attended the Freehold Performing Arts Center, which furthered his training.

Filmography

References

External links

1985 births
Male actors from New Jersey
American male child actors
American male film actors
Living people
Manalapan High School alumni
People from Manalapan Township, New Jersey
21st-century American male actors
African-American male actors
American male television actors
21st-century African-American people
20th-century African-American people